Rhett Motte Dawson (born December 22, 1948) is a former American and Canadian football wide receiver in the National Football League (NFL) and Canadian Football League (CFL). He was drafted by the Houston Oilers in the 10th round of the 1972 NFL Draft and also played in the NFL for the Minnesota Vikings. He played in the CFL for the Saskatchewan Roughriders. Dawson played college football at Florida State.

His brother, Red Dawson, also played in the NFL and coached at Marshall University.

References

External links
Florida State Seminoles bio

1948 births
Living people
People from Valdosta, Georgia
Players of American football from Georgia (U.S. state)
American players of Canadian football
American football wide receivers
Canadian football wide receivers
Florida State Seminoles football players
Houston Oilers players
Minnesota Vikings players
Saskatchewan Roughriders players